Defending champion Shingo Kunieda and his partner Stéphane Houdet defeated Gordon Reid and Maikel Scheffers in the final, 6–3, 6–3 to win the men's doubles wheelchair tennis title at the 2014 Australian Open. It was Houdet's first step towards a Grand Slam.

Michaël Jérémiasz and Kunieda were the defending champions, but did not compete together. Jérémiasz partnered Gustavo Fernández, but was defeated by Reid and Scheffers in the semifinals.

Seeds
  Stéphane Houdet /  Shingo Kunieda (champions)
  Gordon Reid /  Maikel Scheffers (final)

Draw

Finals

External links
 Main Draw

Wheelchair Men's Doubles
2014 Men's Doubles